South Broad–East Fifth Streets Historic District is a national historic district in Burlington, Alamance County, North Carolina. It encompasses 108 contributing buildings in a primarily residential section of Burlington. Most of the buildings are houses, one to two stories high, built between the 1890s and the 1940s in late Victorian, Queen Anne, American Craftsman, and Colonial Revival styles of frame or brick construction.

It was added to the National Register of Historic Places in 2001.

References

Historic districts on the National Register of Historic Places in North Carolina
Queen Anne architecture in North Carolina
Victorian architecture in North Carolina
Colonial Revival architecture in North Carolina
Buildings and structures in Burlington, North Carolina
National Register of Historic Places in Alamance County, North Carolina